Harry Buhrman (born 1966) is a Dutch computer scientist, currently Professor of algorithms, complexity theory, and quantum computing at the University of Amsterdam (UvA), group leader of the Quantum Computing Group at the Centrum Wiskunde & Informatica (CWI), and executive director of QuSoft, the Dutch research center for quantum software.

Buhrman research interests are on Quantum Computing, Quantum Information, Quantum Cryptography, Computational complexity theory, Kolmogorov Complexity, and Computational Biology.

Buhrman contributed substantially to the quantum analogue of Communication complexity, exhibiting an advantage of the use of qubits in distributed information-processing tasks. Although quantum entanglement cannot be used to replace communication, can be used to reduce the communication exponentially.

Buhrman was elected a member of the Royal Netherlands Academy of Arts and Sciences in 2020.

Publications 

 Harry Buhrman, Richard Cleve, John Watrous, and Ronald de Wolf, Quantum fingerprinting, Physical Review Letters 87, 167902 (2001).
 Harry Buhrman, Nishanth Chadran, Serge Fehr, Ran Gelles, Vipul Goyal, Rafail Ostrosky, and Christian Schaffner, Position-based quantum cryptography: impossibility and constructions, SIAM Journal on Computing 43, 150-178 (2014).
 Harry Buhrman, Łukasz Czekaj, Andrzej Grudka, Michał Horodecki, Paweł Horodecki, Marcin Markiewicz, Florian Speelman, and Sergii Strelchuk, Quantum communication complexity advantage implies violation of a Bell inequality, Proceedings of the National Academy of Sciences of the United States of America 113 (12), 3191-3196 (2016).
 Harry Buhrman, Richard Cleve, Serge Massar, Ronald de Wolf, Nonlocality and communication complexity, Rev. Mod. Phys. 82, 665 (2010).

References

External links
 List of publications on Google Scholar

1966 births
Living people
Dutch computer scientists
Members of the Royal Netherlands Academy of Arts and Sciences
Academic staff of the University of Amsterdam